Castelré is a village in the Dutch province of North Brabant. It is a part of the municipality of Baarle-Nassau, and lies some 20 km south of Breda.

In 2000 a millennium chapel was built at the "Kempische-driehoek" 't Groesje.

Castelré belongs to the parish of Klemskerke, Minderhout. As Minderhout is a Belgian village in the community of Hoogstraten only a few hundred metres to the west, people are more oriented to Minderhout than to their official municipality of Baarle-Nassau, over 10 km to the east.

History 
The village was first mentioned in 1231 as "de molendino de Casterle". The etymology is unclear.

Castelré was home to 305 people in 1840. In 1970, a monument was revealed for the first air balloon to land in the Netherlands. It was launched in 1870 in Paris, and supposed to land in France. In 1978, the village was entered in the postal database as Castelre without an accent. As of 2022, it has not been corrected.

Gallery

References

Populated places in North Brabant
Baarle-Nassau